Skeletons is a 2010 British film directed by Nick Whitfield, starring Ed Gaughan, Andrew Buckley, and Jason Isaacs.  It was nominated for 'Outstanding Debut by a British Director' at the 64th British Academy Film Awards. Skeletons was the winner of the "Best new British feature film" award at the 2010 Edinburgh International Film Festival. The plot surrounds two psychic exorcists who travel Britain providing a service to their customers of revealing buried secrets.

Cast
 Ed Gaughan as Davis
 Andrew Buckley as Bennett
 Jason Isaacs as The Colonel
 Paprika Steen as Jane
 Tuppence Middleton as Rebecca
 Josef Whitfield as Jo-Jo
 Keith Lancaster as The Father
 Holly-Mai Leighton as Young Rebecca

Filming locations

Much of the film was shot around Matlock Bath. Ed Gaughan's character lives in a boat in a field beside a power station. The power station is Ratcliffe-on-Soar power station and boats from the River Soar had become stranded in a flood.

Soundtrack 
The track 'Polegnala e Pschenitza', from Le Mystere des Voix Bulgares features prominently in the soundtrack.

References

External links 
 
 

2010 films
British drama films
2010s British films